Guillermo Vilas defeated Brian Gottfried in the final, 6–0, 6–3, 6–0 to win the men's singles tennis title at the 1977 French Open.

Adriano Panatta was the defending champion, but lost in the quarterfinals to Raúl Ramírez.

Seeds
The seeded players are listed below. Guillermo Vilas is the champion; others show the round in which they were eliminated.

  Ilie Năstase (quarterfinals)
  Adriano Panatta (quarterfinals)
  Guillermo Vilas (champion)
  Eddie Dibbs (second round)
  Brian Gottfried (finalist)
  Raúl Ramírez (semifinals)
  Harold Solomon (fourth round)
  Antonio Muñoz (second round)
  Wojtek Fibak (quarterfinals)
  Stan Smith (fourth round)
  Corrado Barazzutti (first round)
  Robert Lutz (first round)
  Jan Kodeš (fourth round)
  Jaime Fillol Sr. (first round)
  Balázs Taróczy (third round)
  François Jauffret (second round)

Draw

Key
 Q = Qualifier
 WC = Wild card
 LL = Lucky loser
 r = Retired

Finals

Section 1

Section 2

Section 3

Section 4

Section 5

Section 6

Section 7

Section 8

External links
 Association of Tennis Professionals (ATP) – 1977 French Open Men's Singles draw
1977 French Open – Men's draws and results at the International Tennis Federation

Men's Singles
French Open by year – Men's singles
1977 Grand Prix (tennis)